The 1884 United States presidential election in South Carolina took place on November 4, 1884, as part of the 1884 United States presidential election. Voters chose 9 representatives, or electors to the Electoral College, who voted for president and vice president.

South Carolina voted for the Democratic nominee, Grover Cleveland, over the Republican nominee, James G. Blaine. Cleveland won the state by a wide margin of 51.84%.

Results

References

South Carolina
1884
1884 South Carolina elections